Miss Grand United Kingdom is a female beauty pageant in the United Kingdom, founded in 2015 by a Lancashire-based pageant organizer, Pageant Girls UK, chaired by Holly Louise, who was also the UK license holder for various other international pageants such as Miss Earth, Miss International, and . The winners of the contest, which usually comprises three or four titles, including Miss Grand England, Miss Grand Wales, Miss Grand Scotland, and Miss Grand Northern Ireland, represent their countries in the international parent contest, Miss Grand International. However, as the former licensee was unable to send the elected delegates to compete in the 2019 international contest in Venezuela, the competition license was transferred to Megan Darlington in 2020, and subsequently to Kathryn Fanshawe in mid-2022.

Since its first participation in 2013, the United Kingdom has not won the Miss Grand International pageant but has placed among the top 20 finalists four times: in 2014, 2016, 2020, and 2022; and also won the best evening gown and best national costume awards in 2016 and 2022, respectively.

History
The United Kingdom has always been participating in the Miss Grand International since 2013. For the first two competitions in Thailand, its representatives were designated to join the contest, of which, Georgia Smith – Miss Grand United Kingdom 2014, becomes the first UK delegate that got placed at the said contest. In 2015, after Holly Louise – the director of the UK Power Pageant, acquired the licenses for England, Scotland, and Wales, she subsequently held the first contest of Miss Grand United Kingdom at Oxford Town Hall in the city of Oxford on 5 September. The contest consisted of 20 national finalists, in which Elizabeth Greenham, Taylor Stringfellow, and Danielle Latimer were announced Miss Grand England, Scotland, and Wales, respectively. After Holly Louise was unable to send representatives for the Miss Grand International 2019 pageant in Venezuela due to safety concerns,  she lost the franchise to Megan Darlington in 2020, who later conducted the pageant for Miss Grand International separately in 2021, and lost the license to Kathryn Fanshawe in the following year.

In 2017, Ashleigh Coyle a 21-year-old Derry-based model and the runner-up Big Brother UK Series 15, was elected Miss Grand Northern Ireland 2017, however, did not participate in the international stage in Vietnam with unknown reasons.

Editions
The following list is the edition detail of the Miss Grand United Kingdom contest, since its inception in 2015.

National finalists
The following list is the national finalists of the Miss Grand United Kingdom pageant, as well as the competition results.

Color keys
 Declared as the winner
 Ended as a runner-up
 Ended as a semifinalist
 Ended as a quaterfinalist
 Did not participate
 Withdraw during the competition

Country Representatives

2016 - 2019 : UK Power Pageant

Representatives at Miss Grand International
Color keys

Gallery

References

External links

 

United Kingdom
Beauty pageants in the United Kingdom
Recurring events established in 2015
2015 establishments in the United Kingdom